Earnest Gould Baker  (August 8, 1875 – October 25, 1945) was an American professional baseball pitcher. He had a 62-74 minor league record, however, emerged as the ace of the  Cotton States League champion Baton Rouge Red Sticks with a 22–9 record in 35 starts. He played in one Major League Baseball game for the Cincinnati Reds on August 18, . He pitched four innings in the game, allowing seven hits and four runs.

External links
, or Stats Crew

1875 births
1945 deaths
Cincinnati Reds players
Major League Baseball pitchers
Baseball players from Michigan
Jackson (minor league baseball) players
Selma Christians players
Atlanta Firemen players
Baton Rouge Red Sticks players
Jacksonville Jays players
People from Concord, Michigan